Gulf Livestock 1 was a Panamanian-registered livestock carrier which sank  west of Amami Ōshima Island in southwest Japan on 2 September 2020 due to Typhoon Maysak. 

The ship was constructed as a container ship named Maersk Waterford by the Hegemann Roland shipyard in Berne, Germany. Her keel was laid on 4 April 2002, she was launched on 20 September, and was delivered on 9 December. She was renamed Dana Hollandia in 2006, Cetus J. in 2012, and in 2015 was converted to a livestock carrier named Rahmeh. In 2019, she was renamed for the last time to Gulf Livestock 1. She had a gross tonnage of 6,370 GT and a deadweight tonnage of 8,372 DWT.

Final voyage
On her final voyage, Gulf Livestock 1 was carrying a cargo of 5,867 live cattle, and was owned by the UAE-based Gulf Navigation Holding shipping company. The vessel left Napier, New Zealand on 14 August, and was scheduled to arrive in the Port of Jingtang, Tangshan China on 3 September 2020.

The ship sent a distress signal from the East China Sea west of the Japanese island of Amami Ōshima on 2 September 2020 at 1:40 am JST (4:40 pm 1 September UTC). The first survivor recovered reported that the ship's sole main propulsion engine failed during rough seas caused by Typhoon Maysak, and the vessel later capsized after being struck by a wave. Before the ship capsized, the 34-year old Filipino ship captain was also able to tell his wife via instant messages that the worsening of the typhoon had caused the ship's engine to fail.

There were 43 crew members on board, 39 from the Philippines, two from New Zealand and two from Australia. The missing Australians were reported to have been an equine veterinarian and a stock handler.

On 2 September, one crew member, a 45-year-old Filipino chief officer, was rescued by the Japanese Coast Guard. On 4 September, a second crew member was found unresponsive in the water by the Coast Guard and died shortly after being rescued. In the same area, several cattle carcasses and a life vest were also recovered. A second survivor, a 30-year-old Filipino deckhand in a life raft, was rescued on the afternoon of 4 September just after 4:00pm.  On 9 September, the Coast Guard suspended the search for survivors.

References

Maritime incidents in 2020
Shipwrecks in the East China Sea
2002 ships
Livestock transportation vehicles